Caught is a 1996 erotic thriller film about a drifter who disrupts the simple life of a fish market owner and his wife. The film was directed by Robert M. Young, and stars Edward James Olmos, Arie Verveen, María Conchita Alonso, and Bitty Schram.

Plot
Joe and Betty, husband and wife, own and run a small Jersey City retail fish market (store). They have a son, Danny, who has left for Los Angeles to try to become an actor. Joe's job is his main focus and he feels that Betty interferes with it. By contrast, Betty is frustrated that he does not accept a good offer to sell the business and feels neglected when Joe goes to bed early as he has to get an early start to buy fish from the wholesale market.

Into their life comes Nick, a young homeless man. Joe and Betty take a liking to Nick and offer him a job as well as lodging in Danny's old room. Nick becomes an apprentice to Joe, showing an interest in the business that Danny never did. Nick also shows an interest in Betty, and it's mutual.

By the time Danny returns home, he finds that he has been all but replaced in the family by a surrogate son, and also rightly suspects that this interloper is having an affair with his mother.

Cast

External links
 

1996 films
1996 drama films
1990s erotic thriller films
Films directed by Robert M. Young
Films shot in New Jersey
Films set in New Jersey
American drama films
1990s English-language films
1990s American films